Daniel Ezra (born 15 December 1991)  is a British actor best known for his role as Spencer James on All American.

Early life
Ezra was born in Birmingham, England. Both his paternal and maternal grandparents were from Jamaica. Growing up, he was a fan of Harry Potter, Philip Pullman books, and The Lord of the Rings. He grew up playing basketball, but stopped sports when he began acting.
Ezra attended Great Barr School, now known as Fortis Academy in Great Barr, Birmingham.

Career
Ezra wasn't interested in acting until he turned 18. On stage, Ezra appeared as Sebastian in Twelfth Night and was nominated for an Ian Charleson Award.
After making his screen debut in the 2014 television film Murdered by My Boyfriend, Ezra began appearing in BBC dramas, including Undercover and The Missing. In 2018, Ezra had a recurring role in the British fantasy drama A Discovery of Witches.

In March 2018, Ezra was cast in a leading role in the American sports drama series All American, which marked his U.S. acting debut and required him to use an American accent.  Once he learned that he had received the role, he spent as much time as he could in South Central Los Angeles and carried a football with him everywhere so that he could practice his accent and learn about the local culture. His favorite rapper, Nipsey Hussle, was from Crenshaw, where the show takes place, so Ezra also studied every song and interview of Nipsey Hussle as a way of practicing his American accent. He did not have an accent coach. In addition, Spencer Paysinger, the real-life football player on whom Ezra's character is based, drove Ezra and his costar Taye Diggs around his local neighborhood so that they could understand the neighborhood dynamics. To prepare for the show, Ezra also watched the NFL Network constantly to learn about the rules of American football. Ezra first realized the show was successful when he attempted to walk in Times Square and was recognized by many fans.

Filmography

References

External links 
 
 

1991 births
Living people
21st-century English male actors
Black British male actors
English male television actors
English people of Jamaican descent
Male actors from Birmingham, West Midlands